Tell Me, Tell Me or Tell Me, Tell Me, Tell Me may refer to:

Tell me tell me!!, song by Dorothy Little Happy
"Tell Me, Tell Me", song by Budgie from You're All Living in Cuckooland
"Tell Me, Tell Me", B-side by Blur from "Sunday Sunday" single
"Tell Me, Tell Me", song by Chaz Jankel from Looking at You
 "Tell Me Tell Me", song by Rainbow from mini album Rainbow Syndrome 2013
"Tell Me, Tell Me, Tell Me", song by Brotherhood of Man from Oh Boy! 
"Tell Me, Tell Me (How Ya Like to be Loved)", song by Curtis Mayfield from Heartbeat
"Tell Me, Tell Me, Tell Me", song by Look See Proof a five-piece indie pop-rock band from Hertfordshire
"Tell Me, Tell Me, Tell Me" (Lyrics: Arudra; Singers: S. P. Balasubramanyam and S. Janaki) America Ammayi